Charles Edward Horsley (16 December 1822 – 28 February 1876), English musician, was the son of William Horsley.

He studied in Germany under Hauptmann and Mendelssohn, and on his return to England composed several oratorios and other pieces, none of which had permanent success. In 1849 he was invited by William Sterndale Bennett to become a founder member of the Bach Society. In 1860 he was appointed to arrange the music for the 1862 International Exhibition. In the following year he emigrated to Australia, where he worked as a choral and orchestral conductor. He was appointed as the organist at Christ Church, South Yarra, but resigned after six months, frustrated by Bishop Perry's injunctions against music, Perry being an extreme Evangelical. In 1872 went to America. Three weeks after landing in America, he was appointed organist of St John's Chapel, New York at a salary of £500 a year, which position he filled to the day of his death. His wife, Georgina, to carry out his wishes, placed him to rest near and with his own people in Kensal Green Cemetery, London.

His works include the oratorio Gideon, Op.50, written for the Glasgow Music Festival in January 1860. There is also a string quartet in C major, the manuscript of which is dated March 1861, shortly after his arrival in Australia; this is probably the first work for this combination to have been written on Australian soil. In  1870 Horsley was commissioned to compose a cantata Euterpe to a poem by Henry Kendall,  performed at the Melbourne Town Hall opening in 1876.

In the United States he wrote sentimental and patriotic songs, which continued to appear until the last year of his life.

The world première of his Mendelssohnian violin concerto op. 29 (1849) was performed on October 11, 2016, in Fayetteville, Arkansas by violinist Selim Giray and University of Arkansas Symphony Orchestra under the direction of conductor Robert K. Mueller.

Horsley was depicted as the composer Auchester in Elizabeth Sara Sheppard's novel Charles Auchester (1853).

References

External links

Free scores at the Mutopia Project

1822 births
1876 deaths
English composers
Australian male composers
Australian composers
19th-century British composers
19th-century English musicians
19th-century British male musicians
William Horsley family